Henry Briscoe (20 May 1861 – 7 March 1911) was an English cricketer.  Briscoe was a right-handed batsman who bowled right-arm fast-medium.  He was born in Bonehill, Staffordshire.

Briscoe made his only first-class appearance for an England XI against the touring Australians at the County Ground, Stoke-on-Trent in 1888.  In this match, he bowled 24 wicket-less overs in the Australians first-innings.  With the bat, he was dismissed for a duck by Charles Turner in the England XI first-innings, one of 6 ducks in the England innings which ended with the England XI 28 all out.  Following on, the England XI fared little, this time being dismissed for 79 runs to hand the Australians an innings and 135 run victory, with Briscoe ending the second-innings unbeaten on 4.

Having played for Staffordshire for a number of years, Briscoe played for the county in the Minor Counties Championship from 1895 to 1896, making 4 appearances.

References

External links
Henry Briscoe at ESPNcricinfo
Henry Briscoe at CricketArchive

1861 births
1911 deaths
People from Tamworth (district)
English cricketers
Staffordshire cricketers